5 is a number, numeral, and glyph.

5, five or number 5 may also refer to:
 AD 5, the fifth year of the AD era
 5 BC, the fifth year before the AD era

Literature
 5 (visual novel), a 2008 visual novel by Ram
 5 (comics), an award-winning comics anthology
 No. 5 (manga), a Japanese manga by Taiyō Matsumoto
 The Famous Five (novel series), a series of children's adventure novels written by English author Enid Blyton

Films
 Five (1951 film), a post-apocalyptic film
 Five (2003 film), an Iranian documentary by Abbas Kiarostami
 Five (2011 film), a comedy-drama television film
 Five (2016 film), a French comedy film
 Number 5, the protagonist in the film Short Circuit (1986 film)

Television and radio
 5 (TV channel), a television network in the Philippines (currently known as TV5 from 2008 to 2018 and again since 2020), owned by TV5 Network, Inc.
 Channel 5 (British TV channel), a British television channel
 BBC Radio 5 Live, a British radio station

People
 Carsten O. Five (born 1949), Norwegian editor and politician
 Håkon Five (1880–1944), Norwegian politician
 Kaci Kullmann Five (1951–2017), Norwegian politician 
 Ole Olsen Five (1846–1930), Norwegian teacher and politician
 Tom Five (Thomas Neil Guay, born 1965), American guitarist

Music
 Five (ballet), a ballet by Jean-Pierre Bonnefoux

Musicians
 #5, the pseudonym of American musician Craig Jones, when performing with Slipknot
 Five (group), a British boy band, stylised 5ive
 The5, a collective of Arab boy singers with band members from Algeria, Morocco, Egypt and Lebanon
 The Five (composers), a group of 19th-century Russian composers

Albums
 5 (Alizée album)
 5 (Berryz Kobo album)
 5, by Big Mama
 5 (Die Antwoord EP)
 5 (Do As Infinity album)
 5, by Ed Sheeran
 5 (Flow album)
 5 (Marieke), by Jacques Brel
 5 (J. J. Cale album)
 5 (Lamb album)
 5 (Lenny Kravitz album)
 5 (Megaherz album)
 5 (Supersilent album)
 5.0, by Nelly
 .5: The Gray Chapter, by Slipknot
 #5, by Suburban Kids with Biblical Names
 Five (The Agonist album)
 Five (Tony Banks album)
 Five (Circus Devils album)
 Five (Dave Douglas album)
 Five (Fancy album)
 Five (Five album), styled 5ive
 Five (Goodbye Mr Mackenzie album)
 Five (Greg Howe album)
 Five (Prince Royce album)
 Five (Ralph Bowen album)
 Five (Shinee album)
 Five (Sugarcult EP)
 Five (White Lies album)
 Fifth (The Autumn Defense album)
 Fifth (Lee Michaels album)
 Fifth (Soft Machine album)
 No.5 (2PM album), by 2PM
 No. 5 (Morning Musume album)
 Number 5 (Ling Tosite Sigure album)
 Number 5 (Steve Miller Band album)
 Joan Baez/5, a 1964 album by Joan Baez
Five/V (Hollywood Undead album)
 Five (EP), by Ayumi Hamasaki

Songs
 "Five" (Meisa Kuroki song), a song by Japanese singer Meisa Kuroki
 "No. 5", a song by Hollywood Undead from Swan Songs
"Five", a song on Machine Head's album The Burning Red
"5", a song from the self-titled album by Ultraspank
"Five", a song by Karma to Burn from the album Almost Heathen, 2001

Transportation

Automobiles
 BMW 5 Series, a 1972–present German mid-size car
 Buick Velite 5, a 2017–2019 Chinese compact hybrid electric liftback
 Chery Arrizo 5, a 2016–present Chinese compact sedan
 Chery Tiggo 5, a 2013–present Chinese compact SUV
 Chevrolet Corvette (C5), a 1996-2004 American sports car
 Mazda5, a 1999–2018 Japanese compact minivan
 MG 5, a 2012–present British-Chinese compact car
 Roewe Ei5, a 2017–present Chinese compact station wagon, sold in the United Kingdom as the MG 5
 Qoros 5, a 2016–present Chinese compact SUV
 Renault 5, a 1972–1996 French subcompact car
 Luxgen S5, a 2012–present Chinese compact sedan, formerly called Luxgen 5

Roads and routes
 List of highways numbered 5
 List of public transport routes numbered 5

Other uses 
 5, an axiom in modal logic
 5 (gum), a brand of gum
 #Five Magazine, a UK online men's magazine
 Five (magazine), a German-language basketball monthly
 Chanel No. 5, a perfume by Coco Chanel
 No. 5, 1948, a painting by Jackson Pollock

05
 The number 5
 The year 2005, or any year ending with 05
 The month of May
 05, the number of the French department of Hautes-Alpes
 05, the number used by racing car driver Peter Brock on most cars he competed with
 Lynk & Co 05, a 2019–present Chinese compact SUV
 VUHL 05, a 2015–2020 Mexican sports car

See also
 Channel 5 (disambiguation)
 The Five (disambiguation)
 The Famous Five (disambiguation)
 Number Five (disambiguation)
 V (disambiguation)
 Volume Five (disambiguation)
 Ƽ, a letter of the Zhuang alphabet 
 Fives, an English sport